Order of Naval Merit may refer to:

 Order of Naval Merit (Brazil)
 Order of Naval Merit (Cuba)
 Order of Naval Merit (Dominican Republic)
 Order of Naval Merit (Russia)
 Order of Naval Merit (Spain)

See also
 Order of merit (disambiguation), a number of separate orders
 Order of Military Merit (disambiguation), a number of separate orders
 Cross of Merit (disambiguation), a number of separate decorations
 Medal of Merit (disambiguation), a number of separate decorations